David Castro (born February 7, 1996) is an American actor, known for his role as Raphael Santiago on the Freeform fantasy series Shadowhunters.

Personal life
Castro was born on Long Island, New York to a Puerto Rican father, Albee Castro, and Kathleen, an American mother of Italian  descent. He has three older sisters and an older brother and currently lives in Long Island, New York.

Career
Castro made his acting debut in the 2004 film Palindromes. He later appeared in the 2006 independent films, A Guide to Recognizing Your Saints and Little Fugitive, alongside his sister Raquel. In 2007, he was featured in the independent film, Tracks of Color and the film Where God Left His Shoes.

He had a role in the 2008 film 27 Dresses, starring Katherine Heigl and the 2009 film The Ministers, starring John Leguizamo. He recently starred in Forged with Manny Perez directed by William Wedig and played Raphael Santiago in Shadowhunters from 2016 to 2019.

Filmography

Awards and nominations

See also

Jewish immigration to Puerto Rico
List of Puerto Ricans

References

External links

 

1996 births
21st-century American male actors
American male child actors
American male film actors
American male television actors
Living people
People from Long Island
American people of Puerto Rican descent
Hispanic and Latino American male actors
American people of Italian descent
American people of Jewish descent